is a coffee beverage that is a popular traditional drink of Senegal and (more recently) Guinea-Bissau, and is named for the city of Touba, Senegal.

The spices are mixed and roasted with coffee beans, then ground into a powder. The drink is prepared using a filter, in a manner similar to that used to prepare drip coffee.

History 
 (French for 'Touba coffee') is named for the city of Touba, Senegal (Hassaniya Arabic , 'Felicity'). The drink is traditionally consumed by the Islamic Mouride brotherhood as it came to Senegal when the brotherhood's founder, Sheikh Amadou Bamba Mbacké, returned from exile in Gabon in 1902. The drink is served during ceremonies, commemorations, and during the Grand Magal of Touba.

Usage 
The coffee-to- ratio is typically around 80 percent coffee to 20 percent . In recent years, consumption of  has been increasing as the drink is spreading to cities of all faiths, both in and outside Senegal. The World Bank wrote that a progressive elimination of imported coffee seems common in poorer areas of Senegal as a result of the global recession of 2009: a Senegalese restaurant owner stated, "We weren't used to  the Tuba Coffee for breakfast, but since the crisis people drink it a lot, also children." Commercial export outside Senegal, while small, is present. In Guinea-Bissau,  has become the country's most popular drink, even though it was relatively unknown several years ago. Consumption of  increased to the point that sales of instant coffee, most notably Nescafé, decreased in West Africa.

See also

References 

 Guèye, Cheikh, "Entre frontières économiques et frontières religieuses: Le café Touba recompose le territoire mouride"; in: Piermay, Jean-Luc; Cheikh, Sarr (eds.), La ville sénégalaise: Une invention aux frontières du monde (in French); Karthala, 2007, pp. 137–151.  .

External links 
 "Café Touba: Une consommation très galopante', L'Office (in French), 7 September 2007.
 "Le 'café Touba', un concurrent de taille à Nescafé', Le Soleil (in French), 26 September 2007.

Coffee drinks
Senegalese cuisine
African cuisine
Islam in Senegal
Sufism in Africa